Benjamin Young House may refer to:
Benjamin Young House (Stevensville, Montana), listed on the NRHP in Montana
Benjamin and Mary Young House, Mentor, Ohio, listed on the NRHP in Ohio
Benjamin Young House and Carriage House, Astoria, Oregon, listed on the NRHP in Oregon